Katherine Regalado (born March 11, 1998 in Lima) is a Peruvian volleyball player, who plays as an opposite. She was a member of the Women's National Team. She plays for Alianza Lima.

Career

2014
Regalado played the South American U18 Championship at home. Peru finished in third place in the round robin, began winning the first day of competition to Uruguay 3-0  scoring 7 points, the next day I had to play against Colombia in which he won 3-0  scoring 9 points, in the third day of competition in Peru will play to play against Chile which won 3-1  scoring 19 points, in the final stretch Peru lost 3-0 to Argentina scoring 11 points, on the last day of competition Brasil won 3-0 to Peru, winning the South American title, she scored 13 points. Regalado was chosen the best opposite of championship.

She played the South American U22 Championship in Colombia. Peru finished in third place in the round robin, began winning the first day of competition to Argentina 3-2, the next day I had to play against Brasil won 3-0 to Peru, in the third day of competition in Peru will play to play against Chile which won 3-1, in the final stretch Peru lost 3-0 to Colombia, on the last day of competition Peru won 3-0 to Venezuela.

Regalado played the Pan-American U23 Cup at home. Peru finished in four place from the competition, winning the first day of competition to Trinidad and Tobago 3-0, in the second day of competition Peru played against Mexico in an intense game that Peru won 3-2, winning the group's championship and qualified for the next World U23 was played against Argentina flipping the marker and winning 3-2. Already in the semifinals he faced Peru against Colombia, losing 1-3; struggle for the bronze medal against Cuba lost 3-1  in that game she scored seven points.

She played the South American U20 Championship in Colombia. Peru finished in second place in the round robin, began winning the first day of competition to Chile 3-1  scoring 8 points, the next day I had to play against Brasil won 3-0 to Peru scoring 5 points, in the third day of competition in Peru will play to play against Argentina which won 3-1  scoring four points,  on the last day of competition Peru won 3-2 to Colombia scoring 5 points.

2017
She won the silver medal in the 2017 Bolivarian Games under 23 tournament.

Clubs
  Alianza Lima (2013–2016)
  Géminis (2016–2018)
  Jaamsa (2018–2020)
  Circolo Sportivo Italiano (2020–2021)
  Sporting Clube de Portugal (2021-2022)

Awards

Individuals
 2014 South American Youth Championship "Best Opposite"

References

External links
 Profile at FIVB

1998 births
Living people
Peruvian women's volleyball players
Place of birth missing (living people)
Volleyball players at the 2015 Pan American Games
Pan American Games competitors for Peru
21st-century Peruvian women